MV Ampere is the world's first battery electric car ferry, operating between Lavik and Oppedal in Norway. It is owned and operated by Norled, and crosses the Sognefjord, the longest and deepest fjord in Norway.

History
MV Ampere is the world's first battery electric car ferry, developed and built in Norway. Its development was the result of a competition, launched by the country's Ministry of Transport and Communications in 2011, to develop an environmentally friendly ferry service between the two villages.

It is reported that she avoids the use of one million litres of diesel annually and offsets 570 t of carbon dioxide and 15 t of nitrogen oxide emissions compared to a conventional ferry on the same route.

Layout
MV Ampere has 260 ft twin hulls constructed from aluminum to minimise weight. She is propelled by Rolls-Royce Azipull thrusters, powered by two 450 kW electric motors with batteries. The 10 t lithium-ion batteries were developed by Corvus Energy and integrated by Siemens with an overall output of 1,000 kWh. They can be recharged in 10 minutes between crossings from high-capacity batteries at each port.

Other energy saving features are LED lighting, solar panels and air conditioning with a waste heat recovery system.

Service
MV Ampere operates the 5.7 km, 20 minute crossing between Lavik and Oppedal.

Footnotes

Ferries of Norway
2014 ships
Ships built in Norway
Electric boats